Acacia bancroftiorum, commonly known as Bancroft's Wattle, is a shrub belonging to the genus Acacia and the subgenus Phyllodineae that is native to parts of eastern Australia.

Description
It has terete red to brown branchlets that are glabrous and pruinose.

Taxonomy
The species was first formally described by the botanist Joseph Maiden as Acacia bancroftii in 1918 as part of the work Proceedings of the Royal Society of Queensland. It was reclassified as Racosperma bancroftii in 1987 by Leslie Pedley then transferred back to the genus Acacia in 2006. The specific epithet honours Joseph Bancroft and his son, Thomas Lane Bancroft.

Distribution
The bulk of the population is situated from around Collinsville in the north down to around Crows Nest in south and out to the west as far as around Tambo. It is found on stony hillsides as a part of open Eucalyptus woodland communities where it grows in shallow sandy soils or sometimes in deep alluvium.

See also
 List of Acacia species

References

bancroftiorum
Flora of Queensland
Plants described in 1918
Taxa named by Joseph Maiden